Juan Martín Imbert (born 31 March 1990) is an Argentine professional footballer who plays as a forward for San Martín de Tucumán.

Career
Imbert's youth career began with La Florida, prior to joining Boca Juniors's youth ranks. He played in five of the club's six matches in the 2011 U-20 Copa Libertadores as they finished as runners-up. Imbert featured on Boca's first-team bench three times during the 2010–11 season. He subsequently made his Boca Juniors senior debut in August 2012 in an Argentine Primera División match with Lanús. He had to wait six months until his next senior appearance for Boca, before departing the team to join Primera B Nacional side Aldosivi on loan. Three goals in thirty-eight matches followed before he returned to his parent club.

In the next season, 2014, he completed a loan move to second tier side Atlético Tucumán. He went onto make forty-two league appearances and scored once across the 2014 and 2015 campaigns. He left Boca Juniors in 2016 to join Guaraní Antonio Franco of Torneo Federal A. He participated in eight fixtures, but didn't score, during the 2016 season. Ahead of 2016–17, Imbert completed a move to Argentine Primera División club Arsenal de Sarandí. His Arsenal debut came on 18 September against Temperley. Imbert joined newly promoted Primera División team Chacarita Juniors on 11 August 2017.

He made his Chacarita debut on 10 September in a league match with Tigre. Quilmes signed Imbert in July 2018.

Career statistics
.

Honours
Atlético Tucumán
Primera B Nacional: 2015

References

External links

1990 births
Living people
Sportspeople from San Miguel de Tucumán
Argentine footballers
Association football forwards
Argentine Primera División players
Primera Nacional players
Boca Juniors footballers
Aldosivi footballers
Atlético Tucumán footballers
Arsenal de Sarandí footballers
Chacarita Juniors footballers
Quilmes Atlético Club footballers
San Martín de Tucumán footballers